The 1962–63 Scottish Division One was won by Rangers by nine points over nearest rival Kilmarnock. Clyde and Raith Rovers finished 17th and 18th respectively and were relegated to the 1963-64 Second Division.

League table

Results

References

1
Scottish Division One seasons
Scot